Roy Allen Saari (February 26, 1945 – December 30, 2008) was an American swimmer and water polo player. He qualified for the 1964 Summer Olympics in both disciplines, and chose swimming, as the Olympic rules of the time did not allow him to compete in two sports. He won a gold medal as a member of the first-place U.S. team in the 4×200-meter freestyle relay, setting a new world record in the final with teammates Steve Clark, Gary Ilman and Don Schollander (7:52.1).  Individually he earned a silver medal in the 400-meter individual medley (4:47.1).  He also advanced to the finals of the 400-meter freestyle and 1,500-meter freestyle, placing fourth and seventh, respectively. Before the Olympics Saari became the first person to break the 17 minute barrier over 1500 m, but in the Olympic final he was suffering from a cold and clocked a mere 17:29.2.

He and his younger brother Robert Saari were on the 1964 Olympic water polo team, which was coached by their father, Urho Saari. He attended the University of Southern California and swam for the USC Trojans swimming and diving team. He also played water polo at the national level. He graduated from USC in 1967 and received his law degree from Loyola Marymount University in 1973. Between 1973 and 1978 he practiced law in Orange County, California, and then worked as a real estate agent and planning commissioner in Mammoth Lakes, California.

Saari died December 30, 2008 of heart failure, aged 63. Earlier in 1976 he was inducted into the International Swimming Hall of Fame. In 1982, he was inducted into the USA Water Polo Hall of Fame.

See also
 List of Olympic medalists in swimming (men)
 List of members of the International Swimming Hall of Fame
 List of University of Southern California people
 World record progression 1500 metres freestyle
 World record progression 4 × 200 metres freestyle relay

References

External links

 

1945 births
2008 deaths
American male freestyle swimmers
American male medley swimmers
American people of Finnish descent
California lawyers
World record setters in swimming
Loyola Law School alumni
Medalists at the 1964 Summer Olympics
Olympic gold medalists for the United States in swimming
Olympic silver medalists for the United States in swimming
Sportspeople from Buffalo, New York
Swimmers at the 1963 Pan American Games
Swimmers at the 1964 Summer Olympics
USC Trojans men's swimmers
Pan American Games gold medalists for the United States
Pan American Games medalists in swimming
Universiade medalists in swimming
Universiade gold medalists for the United States
American male water polo players
20th-century American lawyers
Medalists at the 1963 Pan American Games